On October 27, 2005 Danish police arrested four people in Glostrup on charges of terrorism, in connection to the arrests in Bosnia of Abdulkadir Cesur and Mirsad Bektasevic (AKA Maximus).  All four had been under surveillance for a while.

Suspects

The four original suspects are:
Abdul Basit Abu-Lifâ, born June 1989 in Brøndby Strand, of Palestinian background with dual Danish-Jordanian citizenship. Apparently the most active of the four, he was preparing to join Bektasevic in Sarajevo.  His father discovered his plans and took away his passport and therefore he was replaced by Cesur.  He is said to be very intelligent and a good, but quiet student. He received a seven-year sentence, but was released on parole in 2010. After his release Abu-Lifa legally changed his name to Isaac Meyer. In 2013, he re-appeared in Danish headlines after he assaulted Islam critical teen poet Yahya Hassan. He received a five-month sentence.
A 20-year-old man from Brøndby.  A Bosnian who emigrated with his family to Denmark in 1993.  He was studying industrial technology at the Technical School of Copenhagen.  His family was concerned over his radicalization.
19-year-old young man from Frederiksberg in central Copenhagen.  He was studying at the time of arrest and worked at the telecompany TDC. He started to take an interest in Islam during his second year in high school. Reported to have visited Syria in 2005.
16-year-old minor from Nørrebro.  He is of Moroccan background and grew up in Denmark.

Two additional suspects in their early 20s were arrested two days later after approaching the police.  The two, a man and his girlfriend, has been living in an apartment owned by the sister of one of the suspects arrested previously.

The two were released without charges on November 29.

On November 1 a 22-year-old man was arrested.  He was convicted for sending a death threat to a political organization.  He voluntarily submitted to psychiatric treatment.

Charges

Three of the four original suspects attracted security service attention when they traveled to London to visit Omar Bakri.  They went together to the same mosque in Nørrebro in Copenhagen.  According to reports they hated society and were introverted.

The four also attended the al-Tawhid study circle, organized by Abu Ahmed, in which he spoke against democracy and integration.

The four original suspects had been in contact with Cesur and Bektasevic during the summer of 2005.

According to news reports the four had been considered a terror attack in downtown Copenhagen.  The Nørreport train and Metro station, and Field’s and Fisketorvet shopping malls were all primary targets.

One of the suspects had been detained two weeks prior to his arrest for 'behaving suspiciously' outside a football stadium in Brøndby.  An Israeli team was supposed to play in the stadium and police suspected he might have been planning an attack there.

Evidence

Among the evidence were taped telephone calls and internet communication supposedly connecting the four to the Bosnian investigation.  The four had used different names and call signs, making the investigation a complicated one.  Searches at the residences of the four suspects disclosed 200000 Danish kroner (~35,000 USD) in cash and a substantial collection of Islamist propaganda material.

Prosecutors also had a taped conversation, apparently between Abdul Basit Abu-Lifa and Maximus in which Abu-Lifa says "We’re trying to find a place but it’s too risky".

In many of the taped conversations, the suspects says they will continue their conversation by internet.

The suspects refused to talk to police.

Trial

The trial started on Dec. 6th, 2006.  A jury found all four guilty of planning terror attacks.

On Feb. 15th, 2007 a panel of judges overturned the verdict for three of the suspects, due to insufficient evidence.

The guilty verdict for the fourth suspect, 17-year-old Abdul Basit Abu-Lifa, was upheld.  Abu-Lifa was sentenced to seven years imprisonment.

Later in 2007 the public prosecutor in Copenhagen decided to proceed with a re-trial for one of the 3 suspects whose conviction had been overruled by the judges. The trial was scheduled to commence in January 2008.

References

Jihad in Denmark, Danish Institute for International Studies
Judges overturn terrorism trial verdict, Copenhagen Post
Chaos in wake of terror case decision, Copenhagen Post
Terror Targets, Copenhagen Post
Terror suspects had Sarajevo links, Copenhagen Post
Israeli football match possible terror goal, Copenhagen Post
Terror suspects clam up, Copenhagen Post

Islamic terrorism in Denmark
2005 in Denmark
Terrorist incidents in Europe in 2005
Islamic terrorist incidents in 2005
2005 crimes in Denmark
Terrorist incidents in Denmark in the 2000s